PGE  may refer to:

 Pacific Gas and Electric Company, commonly abbreviated PG&E
 Pacific Gas & Electric (band), an American blues rock band
 Pacific Great Eastern Railway, the original name of BC Rail
 Parser Grammar Engine, Perl 6 rule compiler/interpreter for the Parrot virtual machine
 Platinum group element
 Polska Grupa Energetyczna
 Portland General Electric
 PGE Park
 Propylene glycol ether
 Prostaglandin E
 Provisional Government of Eritrea